The voiceless velar nasal is a type of consonantal sound, used in some spoken languages. (For reasons of legibility, the ring is usually placed above the letter, rather than regular ). The equivalent X-SAMPA symbol is N_0.

Features

Features of the voiceless velar nasal:

Occurrence

See also
 Index of phonetics articles

Notes

References

 
 
 
 
 
 
Chen, Qiguang [陈其光]. 2001. "A Brief Introduction of Bana Language [巴那语概况]". Minzu Yuwen.

External links
 
 

Nasal consonants
Velar consonants
Pulmonic consonants
Voiceless consonants